Established in year 2002, Rajasthan College of Engineering for Women is promoted by Chandrawati Education Society with the aim to enable the girl empowerment through technical education which will help students to unchain barriers to reach greater heights. The college is located very close to National Highway No. 8 on Jaipur-Ajmer segment. It is 12 km from the railway station and central bus stand and 15 km from the airport.

Departments 
UNDER GRADUATE

CSE 
The Department was established in the academic year 2002 offering a 4-year BTech & 2-year MTech Degree Program admitted through the single window Admission procedure of Rajasthan Technical University (RTU), Kota. The Department was NBA (National Board of Accreditation) Accredited in March 2012.

ECE 
The Department of Electronics & Communication is an eminent part of Rajasthan College of Engineering For Women (RCEW), Jaipur which focus on developing the young minds into technically strong and expansion of individuals who can sore high in their future as pragmatic engineers. The Department was established in the academic year 2002 offering a 4-year BTech & 2-year MTech Degree Program admitted through the single window Admission procedure of Rajasthan Technical University (RTU), Kota. The Department was NBA (National Board of Accreditation) Accredited in March 2012.

EE 
The Electrical Engineering Department at RCEW, Jaipur has been active since its inception in 2002. The department has U.G. Programme with about 200 undergraduates Students. The Post Graduate Programme (Electrical Power System) with about 14 Post Graduate Students. The department of Electrical Engineering has well equipped Labs includes Basic Electrical Engineering Lab, Electrical Measurement Lab, Circuit Analysis Lab, Power system Lab, Electrical Machines Lab, Electrical Drives lab, Project Lab etc.

CIVIL

Post graduate

MCA 
Masters in Computer Application (MCA) Program was introduced at Rajasthan College of Engineering for Women, Jaipur in the academic year 2008 – 09, with a sanctioned intake of 60 students.

MBA 
The full-time MBA (Masters of Business Administration) program is focused on Management Systems and is designed to be completed in two years. Apart from the specialized compulsory course in the focus area, the students have choice for functional area specialization in Finance, Marketing, and Human resource.

Research

PhD

Admission 
Admissions to undergraduate courses:
Three modes of admissions to the undergraduate courses:
 REAP
 JEE
 Management Quota

Admission to MCA
Admission to the MCA course is done through counseling done on the basis of rank scored in Rajasthan MCA Admission Test (RMCAAP) which is conducted annually.

Admission to MBA
Admission to the MBA course is done through counseling done on the basis of rank scored in Common Management Admission Test (RMAP) which is conducted annually.

Admissions to M-Tech
Admissions in MTech course is done through counseling done on the basis of rank scored in Centralized Admission to MTech (CAM) which is conducted annually.

Admissions to PhD
Admissions in the PhD is through RTU PhD written exam followed by viva.

Counseling is done on the basis of rank scored in Rajasthan Pre-Engineering Test (RPET) which is conducted annually by Rajasthan Board of Technical Education.

Campus
Spread over a stretch of land, the campus is equipped with facilities comprising:

 Laboratories
 Stocked Library
 Digital Library
 Gymnasium
 Hostel
 Mess
 Indoor Games
 Outdoor Games

References 

Engineering colleges in Jaipur
Women's engineering colleges in India
Women's universities and colleges in Jaipur
Educational institutions established in 2002
2002 establishments in Rajasthan